The 1961 Idaho Vandals football team represented the University of Idaho in the 1961 NCAA University Division football season. Led by eighth-year head coach Skip Stahley, the Vandals were an independent in the NCAA's University Division and went 2–7. Two home games were played on campus at Neale Stadium in Moscow, with one in Boise at old Bronco Stadium at Boise Junior College.

The Vandals suffered a seventh straight loss in the Battle of the Palouse with neighbor Washington State, blanked 0–34 in Pullman in  In the rivalry game with Montana, the Vandals regained the Little Brown Stein with a 16–14 win in the season finale at Boise.

In Idaho's seven losses, they were outscored 319 to 22, with three shutouts; the worst was a 69–0 rout by Utah State in a blizzard at  Since the disbanding of the Pacific Coast Conference in the spring of 1959, Idaho's football teams had a  record in three seasons as an independent.

Stahley continued as Idaho's AD until mid-1964, when he departed for a similar position at Portland State College.

Schedule

All-Coast
Tight end Reggie Carolan was Idaho's only All-Coast selection, on the second team.

NFL Draft
One fifth-year senior from the 1961 Vandals was previously selected in the 1961 NFL Draft:

List of Idaho Vandals in the NFL Draft

References

External links
Gem of the Mountains: 1962 University of Idaho yearbook – 1961 football season
Go Mighty Vandals – 1961 football season
Official game program: Idaho at Washington State –  October 14, 1961
Idaho Argonaut – student newspaper – 1961 editions

Idaho
Idaho Vandals football seasons
Idaho Vandals football